Acrobasis cirroferella is a species of snout moth in the genus Acrobasis. It was described by George Duryea Hulst in 1892, and is known from the US states of Florida and Texas.

The larvae feed on Myrica cerifera.

References

Moths described in 1892
Acrobasis
Moths of North America